The event has been held in 2001, 2005 in Women's Islamic Games.

Editions

See also
Overall Women's Islamic Games Medal Count
Women's Islamic Games

 
Women's international futsal competitions
Women's Islamic Games events
Futsal at multi-sport events